Privates is a 2013 BBC One drama television series set in 1960 which follows the stories of eight privates who are part of the last intake of National Service, and their relationships with their officers and non-commissioned officers, civilian staff and families. The series was written by Damian Wayling, directed by Bryn Higgins and produced by Nick Pitt.

The setting is the fictional North Yorkshire Regiment, although for dramatic effect the characters are from a variety of backgrounds including London, Liverpool, Scotland, Wales and Northern Ireland. Filmed in Northern Ireland, extras were provided by soldiers, wives and families of 2nd Battalion, The Rifles. Locations were Ballykinler Army Base, Tyrella Beach, South Promenade Newcastle.

Cast
 Alexander Vlahos as Private Tom Keenan
 Jack Fox as Private White-Bowne
 Billy Seymour as Private Eddie Wratten
 Ross Anderson  as Private Gordon Lomax
 Sam Swann as Private Rothman
 Matthew Aubrey as Private Owen Davies
 Conor MacNeill as Private McIllvenny
 David Kirkbride as Private Hoy
 Marc Silcock as Lance Corporal Jimmy Hobbs 
 Phil McKee as Corporal Barrowman
 Michael Nardone as Sergeant Michael Butcher
 Richard Katz as Captain Viktor Bulgakov
 Patrick Baladi as Captain Colin Gulliver 
 Emma Stansfield as Audrey Gulliver
 Sara Vickers as Connie Charles
 Sasha Frost as Norah Preston

Character profiles

 Private White Bowne is an educated upper class conservative. He was a member of the Officers' Training Corps (presumably whilst at university or Eton). He hates the fact he has been called up as he has no interest in serving in the army or becoming an officer. White-Bowne claims to have an 'escape plan', which in episode 2 is revealed (after he steals use of the Captain's phone) to involve the Conservative Association of the area he lives in. The rest of the section have a love/hate relationship with White-Bowne, his perceived natural superiority doesn't quite wash with the men of Two Section, and his activities often result in the belittling of section members.
 Private Wratten is a streetwise, smartly dressed young male. His accent and clues in his dialogue suggest he is from London. When asked by the Corporal and Sergeants if he has had any form of training from a military institution, he claims to be part of "The Firm", a gang led by the infamous Kray Twins but it is unknown whether this is true or bravado. In episode 2 it is revealed he has a young son, as questioning by Private White-Bowne reveals.
 Norah Preston is the fiancée of Lance Corporal Hobbs, and works on the base. Her relationship with Lance Corporal Hobbs is controversial in 1960's Britain due to her ethnicity, although the only people that show any form of objection are allegedly Hobbs's parents as she appears to be popular with both NAAFI staff as well as soldiers and officers. However the army care not for her race and are one of her employers. However, her father, a former soldier in the British Army emigrated to the United States following his ill-treatment he was subject to whilst completing his service due to his race and ethnicity. She deceitfully hides the offer of amnesty the army offers her fiancée Norah tries to emigrate to Liverpool, and later the United States, with her AWOL fiancée but is left standing at the station whilst Hobbs returns to the base.

Episode list

References

External links

Episode list using the default LineColor
2010s British drama television series
2013 British television series debuts
2010s British television miniseries
Fiction set in 1960
BBC television dramas
BBC Daytime television series
English-language television shows
Television series set in the 1960s
Television shows set in Yorkshire